Kathy Hoffman (born 1985) is an American educator, speech-language pathologist, and politician who served as the Arizona Superintendent of Public Instruction from 2019 to 2023. A member of the Democratic Party, she took her oath of office with her hand placed on top of the book Too Many Moose, which holds special significance for her and her former students.

Hoffman narrowly lost reelection in 2022.

Education and career
Hoffman earned a bachelor's degree in Japanese Studies at the University of Oregon in 2009 and a master's degree in speech-language pathology from the University of Arizona in 2013. She taught pre-school before beginning her career as a speech-language pathologist. Before running for office, Hoffman worked as a speech-language pathologist at Vail Unified School District and Peoria Unified School District.

Hoffman is fluent in both Japanese and Spanish.

Superintendent of Public Instruction
In 2018, Hoffman defeated former California Republican Congressman Frank Riggs in the race for Superintendent of Public Instruction, after Hoffman defeated former state senator David Schapira in the Democratic primary in a surprise upset. She said she was inspired to run after watching the confirmation of Betsy DeVos as Secretary of Education. Hoffman participated in Arizona’s Citizen’s Clean Election Commission’s campaign funding program, which provides some campaign funding to participating candidates who forgo special interest and high-dollar contributions, yet out-raised her opponent 2-to-1.

An effort to recall Hoffman was launched on February 11, 2021, with supporters having until June 11, 2021 to collect 574,832 signatures to initiate a recall election. Recall supporters criticized Hoffman for allegedly violating her oath of office, particularly in regards to the impact of COVID-19 in schools. The June deadline for signatures was not met and no recall election occurred. The recall effort was led by We the People AZ Alliance, an organization that promotes election fraud conspiracy theories. This group led several other failed recall attempts as well, against the Maricopa County Board of Supervisors, Democratic Secretary of State Katie Hobbs, Republican Governor Doug Ducey, and Republican State Senator Paul Boyer.

Hoffman sought reelection in 2022, but was defeated by Republican former Superintendent Tom Horne.

Elections

References

External links 

 Government website
 

1980s births
21st-century American educators
21st-century American politicians
21st-century American women educators
21st-century American women politicians
American pathologists
Arizona Democrats
Educators from New Jersey
Living people
Politicians from Plainfield, New Jersey
Speech and language pathologists
Superintendents of Public Instruction of Arizona
University of Arizona alumni
University of Oregon alumni
Women in Arizona politics
Women pathologists
Women state constitutional officers of Arizona
Year of birth missing (living people)